Shargole is a medium-sized village and tehsil in Kargil district of the Indian union territory of Ladakh. The village is located 30 kilometres from district headquarters Kargil.

Demographics
According to the 2011 census of India, Shargole has 75 households. The literacy rate of Shargole village is 77.67%. In Shargole, Male literacy stands at 88.39% while the female literacy rate was 65.48%.

Transport

Road
Shargole is connected to other places in Ladakh by the NH 1.

Rail
The nearest railway station to Shargole is Sopore railway station located at a distance of 250 kilometres. The nearest major railway station to Shargole is Jammu Tawi railway station located at a distance of 517 kilometres.

Air
The nearest airport is at Kargil located at a distance of 28 kilometres but it is currently non-operational. The next nearest major airport is Leh Airport located at a distance of 184 kilometres.

See also
Ladakh
Kargil
Leh

References

Villages in Shargole tehsil